"The Champ" is a song performed by American hip hop artist Nelly. It was released on December 20, 2011 digitally for ESPN's bowl coverage.

Music video 
ESPN filmed a full-length video of Nelly performing the song to accompany various game highlight montages surrounding the telecasts. It was primarily filmed at Florida International's FIU Stadium, or "The Cage", in Miami, and was released on December 20, 2011.

Charts

References 

2011 singles
Nelly songs
Songs written by Nelly
2011 songs
Universal Motown Records singles